Gen-Active is a comic book anthology-series from Wildstorm. It was published quarterly from 2000 to 2001 and ran for six issues. In the comic book series, Gen-Actives are superhuman beings who possess the Gen-Factor.

Gen-Active, the comic
Gen-Active featured several ongoing storylines, usually starring Gen-Active superheroes and villains in each issue. Many of the stories dealt with the former members of DV8.

Though often converging, there were three main storylines, each with their own writer:
 Writer Ben Raab with the help of various artists revealed what happened to Evo and Bliss after they left DV8. The two join up and go to New York, where Bliss tries to form her own crime-syndicate. Bliss sacrifices Evo, who is arrested by the police and sent to Purgatory Max, a special prison. A group of Nazi supervillains break into the prison and cause a riot and superhero-group Wildcore is sent to end the riot. This mission would mean the end for most of Wildcore, but Evo redeems himself by saving Wildcore-leader Backlash. Bliss meanwhile increases her power within New York. (Issues #1-4 and 6)
 Writer Jay Faeber with the help of various artists told various stories about Frostbite, Copycat and Sublime, former members of DV8. They meet and fight with their old enemies Gen¹³, mostly due to misunderstandings. At the end of issue 2 the two groups sit down, talk and decide that they no longer have any reasons to be enemies. In issue #3 Faeber interrupts DV8's storyline for a story about Deathblow, but this story connects to DV8 by revealing that Deathblow is Sublime's father. In the following 3 issues, Sublime finds out about her father, meets with Genevieve Cray and with the help of Genevieve Cray the group fights Trance. (Issues #1-6)
 Dan Abnett and Andy Lanning (writers) and Dustin Nguyen (artist) told two solo-stories about Jet in issues #1 and 2. In issue #6 Jet goes to avenge her father, Backlash, by trying to arrest all the escaped Purgatory Max criminals (with a little help of the Midnighter). This storyline followed up on Ben Raab's story about the Purgatory Max riot.

There also were a few short stories:
In issue #3, Eric DeSantis and Brian Stelfreeze told what happened to Freestyle after the end of DV8: she went back to Las Vegas where she ran into Threshold who was building his own army of Gen-Actives.
 Jai Nitz and Jim Mahfood created a dark comical story about Ladytron and Sideways Bob in issue #5.
 Eric DeSantis and Trevor Scott connected Ben Raab's storyline about the Purgatory Max prison break to Jay Faeber's DV8 storyline by having the criminal Trance escape from Purgatory Max and rebuild his group of Freaks in issue #5.

See also
DV8

WildStorm titles